The Russian diaspora is the global community of ethnic Russians. The Russian-speaking (Russophone) diaspora are the people for whom Russian language is the native language, regardless of whether they are ethnic Russians or not.

History 

A significant ethnic Russian emigration took place in the wake of the Old Believer schism in the 17th century (for example, the Lipovans, who migrated southwards around 1700). Later ethnic Russian communities, such as the Doukhobors (who emigrated to the Transcaucasus from 1841 and onwards to Canada from 1899), also emigrated as religious dissidents fleeing centrist authority. One of the religious minorities that had a significant effect on emigration from Russia was the Russian Jewish Population.

Following the establishment of the State of Israel, many Russian Jews fled to the country along with their non-Jewish relatives, with the current estimate of Russians in Israel totalling 300,000 (1,000,000 including Russian Jews who in the Soviet Union were not registered as Russians but rather as ethnic Jews).

The Russo-Japanese War, World War I, and the Russian Revolution that became a civil war happened in quick succession from 1904 through 1923 with some overlap and heightened the strain on Russia and particularly the men expected to participate in military service. A major reason for young men specifically to emigrate out of Russia was to avoid forced service in the Russian army.

In the twentieth century, Emigration from the Soviet Union is often broken down into three "waves" (волны) of emigration. The waves are the "First Wave", or "White Wave", which left during the Russian Revolution of 1917 and then the Russian Civil War; the "Second Wave", which emigrated during and after World War II; and the "Third Wave", which emigrated in the 1950s, 1960s, 1970s, and 1980s.

A sizable wave of ethnic Russians emigrated in the wake of the October Revolution of 1917 and the Russian Civil War of 1917–1922. They became known collectively as the White émigrés. That emigration is also referred to as the "first wave" even though previous emigrations had taken place, as it was comprised the first emigrants to have left in the wake of the Communist Revolution, and because it exhibited a heavily political character.

A smaller group of Russians, often referred to by Russians as the "second wave" of the Russian emigration, left during World War II. They were refugees, Soviet POWs, eastern workers, or surviving veterans of the Russian Liberation Army and other collaborationist armed units that had served under the German command and evaded forced repatriation. In the immediate postwar period, the largest Russian communities in the emigration settled in Germany, Canada, the United States, the United Kingdom, and Australia.

Emigres who left after the death of Stalin but before perestroika, are often grouped into a "third wave". The emigres were mostly Jews, Armenians, Germans, and other peoples who resided outside the former borders of the Russian Empire but now found themselves inside the Soviet Union. Most left in the 1970s.

After the dissolution of the Soviet Union, Russia suffered an economic depression in the 1990s. This caused many Russians to leave Russia for Western countries. The economic depression ended in 2000. Also, during this time, ethnic Russians who lived in other post-Soviet states moved to Russia.

Upon Vladimir Putin's 2022 invasion of Ukraine and the subsequent military mobilization ordered by Putin, Russians have been noted for fleeing the country, most notably to Kazakhstan and Turkey, whose presidents Tokayev and Erdogan respectively have been very critical of Putin's war and in Tokayev's case, sympathetic to Russians leaving the country.

Statistics
Some 20 to 30 million ethnic Russians are estimated to live outside the bounds of the Russian Federation (depending on the definition of "ethnicity").
Official census data often considers the only nationality. The number of native speakers of the Russian language who resided outside of the Russian Federation was estimated as close to 30 million by SIL Ethnologue in 2010.

Former Soviet Union

Former Warsaw Pact

Outside former Soviet Union or Warsaw Pact

Former USSR 

Today the largest ethnic Russian diasporas outside of Russia exist in former Soviet states such as Ukraine (about 9 million), Kazakhstan  (3,644,529 or 20.61% in 2016), Belarus (about 1.5 million), Uzbekistan (about 650,000) Kyrgyzstan (about 600,000) and Latvia (471,276 or 24.7% in 2020).

The situation faced by ethnic Russian diasporas varied widely. In Belarus, there was no perceivable change in status, but in Estonia and Latvia, they were deemed non-citizens if none of their ancestors had been a citizen of those countries before the Soviet occupation in 1940 and they did not request Russian citizenship while it was available.

In March 2022, a week after the start of the Russian invasion of Ukraine, 82% of ethnic Russians living in Ukraine said they did not believe that any part of Ukraine was rightfully part of Russia, according to Lord Ashcroft's polls which did not include Crimea and the separatist-controlled part of Donbas. 65% of Ukrainians – including 88% of those of Russian ethnicity – agreed that "despite our differences there is more that unites ethnic Russians living in Ukraine and Ukrainians than divides us."

East Asia and Southeast Asia

Russians (eluosizu) are one of the 56 ethnic groups officially recognized by the People's Republic of China. They are approximately 15,600 living mostly in northern Xinjiang and also in Inner Mongolia and Heilongjiang. In the 1920s, Harbin was flooded with 100,000 to 200,000 White émigrés fleeing from Russia. Some Harbin Russians moved to other cities, such as Shanghai, Beijing, and Tianjin. By the 1930s, Shanghai's Russian community had grown to more than 25,000.

There are also smaller numbers of Russians in Japan and in Korea. The Japanese government disputes Russia's claim to the Kuril Islands, which were annexed by the Soviet Union in 1945 after the Japanese surrender at the end of World War II. The Soviet Red Army expelled all Japanese from the island chain, which was resettled by Russians and other Soviet nationalities. A few Russians also settled in the Korean Peninsula in the late 19th and the early 20th centuries.

The population of Russians in Singapore is estimated at 4,500 by local Russian embassy in 2018; they are a largely-professional and business-oriented expatriate community, and among them are hundreds of company owners or local heads of branches of large Russian multinationals. President Vladimir Putin visited Singapore on 13 November 2018 to break ground for Russian Cultural Center, which will be home for the first Russian Orthodox church in the region. During the meeting of State Heads, Mdm. Halimah mentioned that there were 690 Russian companies in Singapore 
There are about 40 Russian families living in the Manila Philippines  https://pravoslavie.ru/80526.html

Americas

Russian settlement in Mexico was minimal but well documented in the 19th and the early 20th centuries. A few breakaway sectarians from the Russian Orthodox Church, partial tribes of Spiritual Christian Pryguny arrived in Los Angeles beginning in 1904 to escape persecution from Tsarist Russia and were diverted to purchase and colonize land in the Guadalupe Valley northeast of Ensenada to establish a few villages in which they maintained their Russian culture for a few decades before they were abandoned; cemeteries bearing Cyrillic letters remain.

In the late 1800s, there was a large influx of Jewish immigrants to the United States from Russia and Eastern Europe to escape religious persecution. From the third of the Jewish population that left the area, roughly eighty percent resettled in America. There, many still desired to hold onto their Russian identities and settled in areas with large amounts of Russian immigrants already. Local populations were generally distrustful of their cultural differences.

Dissenters of the official Soviet Communist Party like the Trotskyites such as its leader, Leon Trotsky, found refuge in Mexico in the 1930s, where Trotsky himself was assassinated by Ramon Mercader in 1940.

Some Ukrainian Americans, Belarusian Americans, Russian-speaking Jewish Americans, Russian-speaking German Americans, Georgian Americans, Azerbaijani Americans, Armenian Americans, and Rusyn Americans identify as Russian American.

Finland

Finland borders Russia directly (Finland was an autonomous Russian Grand Duchy between 1809 and 1917 but not part of the Soviet Union, which came about in 1922) and has 31,000 Russian citizens, which amounts to 0.56% of the population, and 80,000 (1.5%) speak Russian as their mother tongue.

Albania
In Albania, the presence of Russians first popped up at the end of 1921, with thousands of former White Army soldiers settling in the nation at the request of Prime Minister Ahmet Zogu. After the Second World War, hundreds of Soviet civilian and military experts being sent to Albania. The Soviet Union withdrew specialists from the country in 1961, resulting about half of the Russian diaspora being forced to remain in Albania permanently. The Russian-speaking diaspora today numbers only about 300 people.

See also
Russian emigration following the 2022 invasion of Ukraine
Russian language in post-Soviet states

References

External links
 Russia Abroad: A comprehensive guide to Russian Emigration after 1917 Biographical databases. Photoarchive. Research results accompanied by original documents, paper extracts.
 Largest Russian-Ukrainian settlement support network outside of xUSSR - 300.000 members 
Mitya's Harbin: Majesty and Menace Bothell, Washington: Book Publishers Network, Second edition, 2018, 536 pp.

 
European diasporas